Anon Pairot is a Thai artist and designer based in Bangkok.

Biography
Born in 1979, Pairot grew up in a family of five. He has one older brother and a younger sister. His parents were owners of a small convenience store in Nonthaburi, just on the outskirts of Bangkok.
Anon Pairot's passion is to analyze physical matter and its design. His works explore the frontiers of design and transcend objects, architecture and the installation of exhibitions, as part of an artistic dimension, which is sustainable and ecological. This particular approach finds its explanation in his original and atypical career: a graduate in mechanical engineering from the North Mongkut University of Technology (KMUTNB), he took the industrial design route with bold aspirations. Today, this creative soul is found in many brands: Habitat, Fendi, Grohe, Philippe Starck Hotel, Ford automobile, Vitra Design Museum, Johnny Walker, Bacardi, Magazine Wallpaper, Interni Magazine, Kenneth Cobonpue, Diagram, Ilumi...

Education
In 1997, Pairot graduated with a degree in mechanical engineering from King Mongkut's University of Technology North Bangkok (KMUTNB). He later shifted his focus from engineering to industrial design, enrolling in the Faculty of Architecture at King Mongkut's Institute of Technology Ladkrabang (KMITL). Pairot chose to focus on industrial design because he wanted to design a whole car, not just car parts. Anon said, "I used to think that engineering means designing everything. I didn't even know industrial design exists [as a separate discipline]."

Early career
After graduating from KMITL in 2003, Pairot started his first full-time work as curator and design director at Srivikorn Group Holding. At this stage in his career, he primarily focused in the areas of research and development for design businesses, retail shops, and department stores. As part of his work, he also dealt with the import of international design products for the Thai market.

Art and philosophy
According to Pairot, design is about people's problems. In an interview with DPI magazine, Pairot said that he wanted to create and produce something that people would love to have and interact with for its practical use: "Design museums are not just [to] keep my design works in glass boxes but [to] use them in everyday life, too." "I like fixing people's problems by design. Things on Earth come from a kind of creation, either man-made or natural. And I see their value as equal in terms of one function only: to solve people's problems." He adds, "Design is the art of changing people's valuation process."

As a Thai designer, Pairot believed that Thai design was undervalued. Despite much overseas experience and success, Pairot is still drawn by the potential of Bangkok and Thailand. "Nobody knows what will happen next in Bangkok. It's a city filled with chaos and complexity. No other city is so stimulating. What we seek daily is to change invisible charm into a miraculous charm." In his design work, he focuses on traditional Thai construction techniques and materials. For example, his Loft Lounge Chair (2002) design incorporates sustainable, local materials such as water hyacinth and rattan. In 2007, Maison et Objet published Inspirations Book n°11, which features Pairot's Cell armchair. "The Cell collection is produced using special craft techniques. The design is lightweight with thought to reducing waste and ease of recycling, reused material but sustainable for indoor–outdoor." Inspired by tropical pollen, Kaysorn (lit. pollen in Thai) lamp is another design by Anon Pairot, which exudes "the spirit of the Asian culture", especially that of the Thai tropical climate.

In 2009, Pairot was invited by Vitra Design Museum to be a representative at the Boisbuchet Workshop at CIGE, Beijing.

Business management
In 2007, Anon Pairot founded his own design studio, the Anon Pairot Design Studio. His business model considers "how to increase the value of a piece of wood from 10 baht to 1,000 baht." Anon thus views sustainability in his business as a strategic offense: "Sustainability is not about giving someone a school of fish, but it is about teaching him how to catch more fish."

Pairot sees the need for diversity not only in his design work but also in the company. He acts as both a design as well as branding consultant, employing industrial designers, graphic designers, interior designers, stylists, sculptors and architects. The company's clients range from a local furniture manufacturer to Phillip Morris, Smirnoff and Fendi. In a statement with AXIS magazine, Pairot explains, "I'll work with any client who seeks unconventional ideas for anything from a toothpick to a yacht."

The Anon Pairot Design Studio has created interior designs for Bankok's Hard Rock Cafe outlet and Christmas trees designs inspired by Toyota.

In 2012, Anon was featured as a new business entrepreneur on a reality TV program called "Bangkok's New Young Billionaire (อายุน้อยร้อยล้าน)."

References

1979 births
Living people
Anon Pairot